Windscoop is the name of two geographical features in Antarctica:

Windscoop Bluff, Ross Dependency
Windscoop Nunataks, Graham Land